John Child (c. 1677 – 14 February 1703), of the Middle Temple, London, was an English politician.

He was a Member (MP) of the Parliament of England for Devizes in the period 14 November 1702 – 14 February 1703.

References

1677 births
1703 deaths
English MPs 1702–1705